Neuro-Ophthalmology is an English language, peer-reviewed medical journal that covers diagnostic methods in neuro-ophthalmology such as visual fields, CT scanning and electrophysiology, the visual system such as the retina, oculomotor system, pupil, neuro-ophthalmic aspects of the orbit, and related fields such as migraine and ocular manifestations of neurological diseases.

Editors 
The Editors-in-Chief of Neuro-Ophthalmology are Gordon Plant (National Hospital for Neurology and Neurosurgery, London, UK) and Walter Jay (Loyola University Medical Center).

References 

Neuroscience journals
Publications established in 1980
Ophthalmology journals